Rob Bell (born 1979) is a British TV presenter, adventurer, engineer and STEMnet ambassador. He has appeared on TV programmes on BBC, Channel 5, Travel Channel (now DMAX) and Yesterday.

In 2015 Bell became one of a very few people to have successfully run seven marathons on seven continents in seven days.

Early life
Born in Buckinghamshire in 1979, his father's work with General Motors took the family to the United States when Rob was six and on to the outskirts of Paris when he was nine.  His mother was a big influence for what was to become a passion for engineering.

He achieved a Master's degree in Mechanical Engineering with French at the University of Bath, completing his dissertation at University in Lyon, France. He had previously worked for French radio station Connexion FM and the Energy Saving Trust before he started in television.

Career
His first television work was the BBC series Engineering Giants, which he co-hosted with engineer turned comedian Tom Wrigglesworth in 2012. In 2013 he presented the Travel Channel programme Rob Bell's Engineering Enigmas and its series Man Vs World, where he participated in several adventure sports in different locations around the world. This was followed up in 2014 by the BBC programme The Science of D-Day, and another Travel Channel programme Secrets and Mysteries London and the Channel 5 six-part series Underground Britain.

In 2015 Bell presented the BBC history programme Haslar: Secrets of a War Hospital, and then completed seven marathons on seven continents for the Travel Channel series Monster Marathon Challenge.

In 2016 Bell presented the BBC documentary Tank Men to commemorate 100 years since the first use of tanks, and narrated the BBC series Sea Cities. He also presented the Channel 5 series Britain's Greatest Bridges. He also appeared as a contributor to the Yesterday series Abandoned Engineering, which was later adapted to the 2017 US series Mysteries of the Abandoned on the Science Channel.

During 2017 he presented further Channel 5 programmes: Inside the Tube – Going Underground, Great British Royal Ships, and The World's Greatest Bridges. He co-presented The Great Fire (with Dan Jones and Suzannah Lipscomb) and Brunel:The Man who Built Britain. He also presented the BBC show Invented in The South.

In 2018 Bell presented further programmes for Channel 5 with The Flying Scotsman airing in February, World's Tallest Skyscrapers in June and Walking Britain's Lost Railways in September. A second series of Walking Britain's Lost Railways premiered in 2020.

In 2021, Bell presented the Channel 5 series London's Greatest Bridges with Rob Bell.

Filmography

References

External links
 
 https://www.robbell.tv/resume

1979 births
Living people
BBC television presenters
English television presenters
Alumni of the University of Bath
English engineers